Mystics of the Pillar II is an EP by the black metal band Melechesh.

Track listing

Personnel

Melechesh Ashmedi: Vocals, Twelve-String Guitar, Electric Sitar-Guitar, Piano, Percussion
Moloch: Electric & Twelve-String Acoustic Guitars
Rahm: Bass
Xul: Drums, Percussion

References

2012 EPs
Melechesh albums
Nuclear Blast EPs